Jumabieke Tuerxun is a Kazakh-Chinese mixed martial arts fighter and trainer. He currently fights as a Bantamweight.

Early life
Jumabieke is an ethnic Kazakh from the Chinese autonomous region of Xinjiang.

Jumabieke trains out of China's elite Xian Physical Education University, where he is a pupil of Zhao Xuejun. Jumabieke is a well-rounded fighter who combines pinpoint Sanda striking with freestyle Wrestling. Jumabieke is also associated with Phuket Top Team, Thailand.

Mixed martial arts career
Jumabieke fought on the Chinese regional scene before joining Ranik Ultimate Fighting Federation (RUFF China) in 2011. He had a KO win over Bolin Li at RUFF 1 and a unanimous decision victory over Yanfei Zhao at RUFF 2.

Jumabieke rematched and defeated Honggang Yao via unanimous decision (3 rounds) at Legend Fighting Championship 7 for the bantamweight strap. He then returned to RUFF  garnering a shot at the bantamweight strap against Irshaad Sayed, but the fight was cancelled due to UFC interest in Jumabieke.

Ultimate Fighting Championship
The UFC signing Jumabieke was widely reported in early 2013, however Jumabieke had to wait over a year to debut for the promotion. During the hiatus Jumabieke stated his professional mixed martial arts record was not an accurate, even claiming he fought three times in December 2013.

With an official MMA record of 15-0 Jumabieke was scheduled to fight Mark Eddiva at The Ultimate Fighter: China Finale in a featherweight fight. Eddiva controlled Tuerxun en route to a unanimous decision.

Jumabieke returned to the Octagon at The Ultimate Fighter 19 Finale against Leandro Issa. In a Fight of the Night battle, Issa caught Tuerxun in an armbar in the third round.

Jumabieke was scheduled to meet Patrick Williams but due to injury he instead fought Marcus Brimage on November 8, 2014 at UFC Fight Night: Rockhold vs. Bisping, in Sydney Australia. He was defeated via first-round knockout due to a head kick and follow up punches and was subsequently released from the promotion.

Mixed martial arts record

|-
|Win
|align=center|22–10–1
|Yaser Ashayeri
|KO (punch)
|Octagon 38
|
|align=center|1
|align=center|3:32
|Almaty, Kazakhstan
|
|-
|Win
|align=center|21–10–1
|Hasan Mammedov
|Submission (rear-naked choke)
|Octagon 32
|
|align=center|1
|align=center|1:30
|Almaty, Kazakhstan
|
|-
|Loss
|align=center|20–10–1
|Rasul Tezekbaev
|Decision (unanimous)
|Mergen Fighting Championship
|
|align=center|3
|align=center|5:00
|Atyrau, Kazakhstan
|
|-
|Loss
|align=center|20–9–1
|Alexandre Almeida
|Decision (majority)
|PFL 8
|
|align=center|2
|align=center|5:00
|New Orleans, Louisiana, United States
|
|-
|loss
|align=center|20–8–1
|Lance Palmer
|Submission (rear-naked choke)
|PFL 4
|
|align=center| 3
|align=center| 4:34
|Uniondale, New York, United States 
| 
|-
|Loss
|align=center|20–7–1
|Andre Harrison
|Decision (unanimous)
|PFL 1
|
|align=center|3
|align=center|5:00
|New York, New York, United States
|
|-
|Loss
|align=center|20–6–1
|Boris Fedorov
|Decision (unanimous)
|Modern Fighting Pankration 220
|
|align=center|3
|align=center|5:00
|Khabarovsk, Russia
|
|-
| Win
|align=center|20–5–1
|Sergey Yakovlev	
|TKO (punches)
|Kunlun Fight MMA 14
|
|align=center| N/A
|align=center| N/A
|Qingdao, Shandong, China
|
|-
|Loss
|align=center|19–5–1
|Aliyar Sarkerov
|Submission (guillotine choke)
|Kunlun Fight MMA 13
|
|align=center|3
|align=center|N/A
|Qingdao, China
|
|-
| Win
|align=center|19–4–1
|Alison Santos Marques	
|KO (punches)
|Kunlun Fight MMA 12
|
|align=center| 1
|align=center| N/A
|Yantai, China
|
|-
|Win
|align=center|18–4–1
|Paata Robakidze	
|KO (kick to the body)
|Kunlun Fight MMA 7
|
|align=center| 2
|align=center| 2:19
|Beijing, China
|
|-
|Loss
|align=center|17–4–1
|Soo Chul Kim
|TKO (punches)
|Road FC 032
|
|align=center|1
|align=center|2:51
|Changsha, China
|
|-
| Win
|align=center| 17–3–1
|Giovanni Moljo
|Decision (unanimous)
|WBK 15 - Ningbo
|
|align=center| 3
|align=center| 5:00
|Ningbo, China
|
|-
| Win
|align=center| 16–3–1
|Alison Santos Marquez 
|Decision (unanimous)
|WBK 11: Call of Duty
|
|align=center| 3
|align=center| 5:00
|Ningbo, China
|
|-
|Draw
|align=center|15–3–1
|Alison Santos Marques
|Draw (majority)
|WBK 8: Return of the King
|
|align=center|3
|align=center|5:00
|Yining, China
|
|-
|Loss
|align=center|15–3
|Marcus Brimage
|KO (head kick)
|UFC Fight Night: Rockhold vs. Bisping
|
|align=center|1
|align=center|2:58
|Sydney, Australia
|
|-
|Loss
|align=center| 15–2
|Leandro Issa
|Submission (armbar)
|The Ultimate Fighter: Team Edgar vs. Team Penn Finale
|
|align=center| 3
|align=center| 3:49
|Las Vegas, Nevada, United States
|
|-
|Loss
|align=center| 15–1
|Mark Eddiva
|Decision (unanimous)
|The Ultimate Fighter China Finale: Kim vs. Hathaway
|
|align=center| 3
|align=center| 5:00
|Macau, SAR, China
|
|-
| Win
|align=center| 15–0
|Yoshiki Nakahara
|Decision (unanimous)
|Fighting China
|
|align=center| 2
|align=center| 5:00
|Zhaoqing, China
|
|-
| Win
|align=center| 14–0
|Yongqiang Zhang
|Technical Submission (Von Flue choke)
|Ranik Ultimate Fighting Federation 6
|
|align=center| 1
|align=center| 1:30
|Hohhot, China
|
|-
| Win
|align=center| 13–0
|Longyun Jiang
|KO (punch)
|Ranik Ultimate Fighting Federation 5
|
|align=center| 1
|align=center| 1:40
|Hohhot, China
|
|-
| Win
|align=center| 12–0
|Irshaad Sayed
|Decision (split) 
|Ranik Ultimate Fighting Federation 3
|
|align=center| 3
|align=center| 5:00
|Hohhot, China
|
|-
|Win
|align=center| 11–0
|Honggang Yao
|Decision (split)
|Legend FC 7
|
|align=center| 3
|align=center| 5:00
|Macau, SAR, China
|
|-
| Win
|align=center| 10–0
|Yanfei Zhao
|Decision (unanimous)
|Ranik Ultimate Fighting Federation 2
|
|align=center| 3
|align=center| 5:00
|Hohhot, China
| 
|-
| Win
|align=center| 9–0
|Rustam Taldiev
|Decision (unanimous) 
|Top of the Forbidden City 7
|
|align=center| 3
|align=center| 5:00
|Beijing, China
| 
|-
| Win
|align=center| 8–0
|Michel Boom
|Submission (armbar)
|Top of the Forbidden City 5
|
|align=center| 2
|align=center| 1:10
|Beijing, China
| 
|-
| Win
|align=center| 7–0
|Bolin Li
|KO (punch)
|Ranik Ultimate Fighting Federation 1
|
|align=center| 1
|align=center| 2:40
|Shanghai, China
| 
|-
| Win
|align=center| 6–0
|Robert Lek
|Submission (armbar)
|Top of the Forbidden City 3
|
|align=center| 1
|align=center| 0:56
|Beijing, China
|
|-
| Win
|align=center| 5–0
|Irshaad Sayed
|Decision (unanimous)
|Top of the Forbidden City 1
|
|align=center| 3
|align=center| 5:00
|Beijing, China
|
|-
| Win
|align=center| 4–0
|Yu Long Fei
|Decision (unanimous)
|Wenwu Cup - Combat China
|
|align=center| 3
|align=center| 5:00
|Beijing, China
|
|-
| Win
|align=center| 3–0
|Honggang Yao
|TKO (doctor stoppage)
|Xian Sports University - Ultimate Wrestle
|
|align=center| 2
|align=center| 5:00
|Beijing, China
|
|-
| Win
|align=center| 2–0
|Zhen Wang
|Submission (guillotine choke)
|Ultimate Martial Arts Combat
|
|align=center| 2
|align=center| 1:13
|Beijing, China
|
|-
| Win
|align=center| 1–0
|Zhouwen Jiang
|Decision (unanimous)
|KO - China vs. Thailand
|
|align=center| 3
|align=center| 5:00
|Beijing, China
|
|-

See also
 List of current UFC fighters
 List of male mixed martial artists

References

External links
 
 

1986 births
Living people
Chinese male mixed martial artists
Bantamweight mixed martial artists
Featherweight mixed martial artists
Chinese practitioners of Brazilian jiu-jitsu
Chinese sanshou practitioners
Chinese male sport wrestlers
Kazakhs in China
Sportspeople from Xinjiang
Chinese people of Kazakhstani descent
Ultimate Fighting Championship male fighters
Kunlun Fight MMA Fighters
Mixed martial artists utilizing sanshou
Mixed martial artists utilizing freestyle wrestling
Mixed martial artists utilizing Brazilian jiu-jitsu